Nezhdanovka is a rural locality (a settlement) in Yasenkovskoye Rural Settlement, Bobrovsky District, Voronezh Oblast, Russia. The population was 74 as of 2010.

Geography 
Nezhdanovka is located 11 km southwest of Bobrov (the district's administrative centre) by road. Nikolo-Varvarinka is the nearest rural locality.

References 

Rural localities in Bobrovsky District